Sheridan County School District #2 is a public school district based in Sheridan, Wyoming, United States.

Geography
Sheridan County School District #2 serves the central portion of Sheridan County, including the following communities:
Incorporated places
City of Sheridan
Census-designated places (Note: All census-designated places are unincorporated.)
Story (most)
Unincorporated places
Banner
Wolf
Wyarno

Schools

High school
Grades 9-12
Sheridan High School

Junior high school
Grades 6-8
Sheridan Junior High School

Elementary schools
Grades K-5
Coffeen Elementary School
Highland Park Elementary School
Meadowlark Elementary School
Sagebrush Elementary School
Story Elementary School
Woodland Park Elementary School

Alternative schools
Grades 9-12
Fort Mackenzie High School
Grades 6-8
The Wright Place

Student demographics
The following figures are as of October 1, 2008.
Total District Enrollment: 3,121
Student enrollment by gender
Male: 1,592 (51.01%)
Female: 1,529 (48.99%)
Student enrollment by ethnicity
White (not Hispanic): 2,846 (91.19%)
Hispanic: 151 (4.84%)
American Indian or Alaskan Native: 60 (1.92%)
Asian or Pacific Islander: 41 (1.31%)
Black (not Hispanic): 23 (0.74%)

See also
List of school districts in Wyoming

References

External links
Sheridan County School District #2 – official site.

Education in Sheridan County, Wyoming
School districts in Wyoming
Sheridan, Wyoming